West Central Conference may refer to:

West Central Conference (Illinois)
West Central Conference (Indiana)
West Central Activities Conference (Iowa)
West Central Conference (Minnesota)

See also
 
 Western Conference (disambiguation)
 North Central Conference (disambiguation)
 Conference
 West Central (disambiguation)
 Central (disambiguation)
 Centre (disambiguation)
 Center (disambiguation)
 West (disambiguation)